Mary F. O'Brien is a United States Air Force lieutenant general who serves as the director for command, control, communications, and computers/cyber and chief information officer of the Joint Staff since August 5, 2022. She most recently served as the Deputy Chief of Staff for Intelligence, Surveillance, Reconnaissance and Cyber Effects Operations from 2019 to 2022. Prior to serving in that position, O'Brien commanded the Twenty-Fifth Air Force.

O'Brien is from Bloomfield Hills, Michigan and graduated from the United States Air Force Academy in 1989 with a Bachelor of Science in chemistry. In April 2022, O'Brien was nominated for appointment as director of command, control, communications, and computers/cyber and chief information officer of the Joint Staff.

Effective dates of promotions

References

 

 
 

 
 

 

 

Air War College alumni
George Washington University alumni
Living people
Recipients of the Air Force Distinguished Service Medal
Recipients of the Defense Superior Service Medal
Recipients of the Legion of Merit
United States Air Force Academy alumni
United States Air Force generals
United States Air Force personnel of the War in Afghanistan (2001–2021)
Year of birth uncertain
Year of birth missing (living people)